The SASF Cup was an association football competition that took place in South Africa between 1961 and 1985. The participants were affiliated to the South African Soccer Federation and Federation Professional League.

References 

Soccer and apartheid
Defunct soccer cup competitions in South Africa